Bickelomyia is a genus of flies in the family Dolichopodidae. It is known from Mexico and Costa Rica. The genus is named after the Australian dipterologist Daniel J. Bickel.

Species
Bickelomyia canescens Naglis, 2002
Bickelomyia flaviseta Naglis, 2002
Bickelomyia nigriseta Naglis, 2002
Bickelomyia setipyga Naglis, 2002
Bickelomyia subcanescens Naglis, 2002

References

Dolichopodidae genera
Neurigoninae
Diptera of North America